Bishopric of Verden may refer to:

Diocese of Verden, the ecclesiastical jurisdiction of the bishop of Verden
Prince-Bishopric of Verden, the secular jurisdiction of the bishop of Verden